Party at Tiffany's is an American reality-documentary television series on the Oprah Winfrey Network. The series premiered on December 3, 2011.

Premise
The series follows Tiffany Young and her Atlanta, Georgia-based bakery, Pink Pastry Parlor.

Episodes

References

External links
 
 

2011 American television series debuts
2011 American television series endings
English-language television shows
Oprah Winfrey Network original programming